Kenneth Jesus Gregorio "Kenny" Kunst (born 1 November 1986) is a Curaçaon footballer who plays as a forward for Centro Dominguito.

International career
Kunst originally played for the Netherlands Antilles, playing 3 games for the Under 20 side in the preliminary qualification rounds at the 2005 CONCACAF U-20 Tournament and scoring once. He played 5 games in total for the senior squad, scoring once against Guyana in a 3-2 defeat at the 2010 Caribbean Cup qualification.

When the Netherlands Antilles dissolved in 2010, Kunst chose to represent Curaçao at international level. He made his début on 20 August 2011 in a 1-0 friendly loss against the Dominican Republic.

Kunst has also represented the nation of Bonaire. As Bonaire are not recognised by FIFA, any matches played are unofficial. He played two matches in the 2011 ABCS Tournament, scoring both times. His goals came in a 3-1 victory over Curaçao and in the final; a 2-2 draw with Aruba, which Bonaire went on to win 4-3 on penalties.

Career statistics

International

International goals

Netherlands Antilles
Scores and results list the Netherlands Antilles' goal tally first.

Bonaire
Scores and results list the Bonaire's goal tally first.

References

External links 
 
Kenny Kunst at CaribbeanFootballDatabase

1986 births
Living people
Dutch Antillean footballers
Curaçao footballers
Bonaire footballers
Association football forwards
Bonaire international footballers
Dual internationalists (football)
Centro Social Deportivo Barber players
RKSV Centro Dominguito players
S.V. Victory Boys players